Aimaq Kipchaks are Aimaq tribe of Kyrgyz origin that can be found in Obi district to the east of western Afghanistan's province of Herat, between the rivers Farāh Rud and Hari Rud. Afghan Kypchaks together with the Durzai and Kakar, two other tribes of Pashtun origin, constitute Taymani tribe. There are approximately 440,000 Afghan Kipchaks.

See also 
 Aimaq people
 Taymani (Aimaq tribe)
 Kipchaks

References 

Aymaq
Ethnic groups in Afghanistan
Turkic peoples of Asia